Group C was one of four groups of national teams competing at the 2010 Africa Cup of Nations. The group's first round of matches began on January 12 and its last matches were played on January 20. Most matches were played at the Complexo da Sr. da Graça in Benguela and featured the defending champions Egypt, joined by Nigeria, Benin, and  Mozambique.

Standings

Egypt vs Nigeria

Mozambique vs Benin

Nigeria vs Benin

Egypt vs Mozambique

Egypt vs Benin

Nigeria vs Mozambique

Group
Group
2009–10 in Nigerian football
Cup
Foo